Left Handed Straw is the first album by the  American indie hip hop producer Controller 7. It was released on the 6months label in 2001.

Track listing
 Intro - 0:21  
 Movie Trailer - 2:36  
 Stane - 1:24  
 Love - 1:22  
 Bunny Slippers - 2:45  
 Solitary Man - 1:34  
 Test #1 - 0:37  
 Follow the Light - 1:28  
 Yellow - 3:15  
 Secrets - 1:40  
 Dismantled - 1:03  
 Test #2 - 1:34  
 Unknown - 6:11  
 The Balerina - 1:08  
 The Forest - 2:44  
 ??? - 0:36  
 Morality - 2:37  
 Test #3 - 1:36  
 Balance - 0:39  
 Unbalanced - 1:27  
 Check #434 - 0:32  
 The Candle (Remix) - 5:56  
 The Place Where Smiles Hide - 1:32  
 Tuesday - 0:31  
 Over the Hill - 1:52  
 Animal Control - 1:25 
 Imagination Cycle - 3:01  
 The World Outside My Door - 0:49  
 Test #4 - 0:33  
 Impatience - 1:00  
 Slip of the Tongue - 0:32  
 ....First Time Ever - 0:37  
 Test #5 - 1:07  
 Rain Men (Left Handed) - 4:49  
 Final Call - 1:33  
 Final Test - 0:40  
 Heckles from the Peanut Gallery - 9:35

References

Instrumental hip hop albums
2001 debut albums